Celidosphenella stonei is a species of tephritid or fruit flies in the genus Celidosphenella of the family Tephritidae.

Distribution
Argentina, Chile.

References

Tephritinae
Insects described in 1946
Diptera of South America